Meenakshi Vijaykumar is the first Indian Woman fire officer. At Present she is working as the Joint Director, State Training Center, Tambaram, Chennai. She has received The President's Medal for Gallantry in 2013 for saving two lives. She has also received The President's Medal for Meritorious Service in 2019. She is the first Indian Fire Officer to have Won medals in the World Firefighter's Games and World Police and Fire Games held in South Korea, Australia, USA and also Indian Fire Service Games held in Nagpur.

Education
She did her schooling in Bharath Senior Secondary School, Chennai. She completed her under graduation and post graduation in English Literature from Ethiraj College,  Chennai.  She completed her PG diploma in Industrial Relation and Personnel Management, from Bharatiya Vidya Bhavan, New Delhi in 1991. She completed her Degree of Bachelor of Education from Annamalai University in 1994. She has also completed Advanced Diploma courses in National Fire Service College. She was awarded certificate of "Graduate Member" by Institute of Fire Engineers, India in 2008 and was awarded IFE Level 4 Certificate in Fire Science and Fire Safety (HL) by Institute of Fire Engineers, Marton on Marsh, United Kingdom in 2014. She was also awarded NEBOSH International General Certificate in occupational Health and safety by National Examination Board in Occupational Safety and Health, England in 2014., Master of Business Administration (MBA) in 2017.

Career
Meenakshi Vijayakumar started her career as assistant professor in English at Chellamal College, Chennai in 1990. She worked as a lecturer in Communication Technique at Father Agnel Institute of Management, New Delhi. She cleared Group 1 service exam in 1998, but had to wait until 2003, before it was decided that women officers could be included in fire service.

She worked as the Divisional Fire Officer of north Chennai for four and a half years and suburban Chennai for one and a half years. She has attended more than 400 fire and rescue calls. She took part in the rescue operations in the Tsunami disaster. She was also responsible for organizing fire safety programs in her division. She has trained more than 30 batches of fire officers from all over India.

In 2013 she was awarded the President's Fire Service Medal for Gallantry. She gives talks encouraging young Indian women to pursue careers.

Personal details 

She is the daughter of late Mr P.K. Padhmanathan, former Joint Registrar, Co-operative society and Dr. V.S. Krishnakumari, former director, Children's Hospital, Egmore, and the eldest granddaughter of Kakkan.

References 

 
 
 1 dies, 3 rescued as pit caves in at Pallikaranai | Deccan Chronicle

External links

What they say – The Hindu

Women in firefighting
Indian firefighters
Women from Tamil Nadu
People from Madurai district
1964 births
Living people